The Battle of Point Pleasant, also known as the Battle of Kanawha, was the only major action of Dunmore's War. It was fought on October 10, 1774, between the Virginia militia and Shawnee and Mingo warriors. Along the Ohio River near modern-day Point Pleasant, West Virginia, forces under the Shawnee chief Cornstalk attacked Virginia militiamen under Colonel Andrew Lewis, hoping to halt Lewis's advance into the Ohio Valley. After a long and furious battle, Cornstalk retreated. After the battle, the Virginians, along with a second force led by Lord Dunmore, the Royal Governor of Virginia, marched into the Ohio Valley and compelled Cornstalk to agree to a treaty, which ended the war.

Preparations
Colonel Andrew Lewis, in command of about 1,000 men, was part of a planned two-pronged Virginian invasion of the Ohio Valley. As Lewis's force made its way down the Kanawha River, guided by pioneering hunter/trapper Matthew Arbuckle Sr., Lewis anticipated linking up with another force commanded by Lord Dunmore, who was marching west from Fort Pitt, then known as Fort Dunmore. Dunmore's plan was to march into the Ohio Valley and force the indigenous inhabitants to accept Ohio River boundary which had been negotiated with the Iroquois in the 1768 Treaty of Fort Stanwix.

The Shawnee, however, had not been consulted in the treaty and many were not willing to surrender their lands south of the Ohio River without a fight. Officials of the British Indian Department, led by Sir William Johnson until his death in July 1774, worked to diplomatically isolate the Shawnee from their neighbors. As a result, when the war began, the Shawnees had few allies other than some Mingos.

Cornstalk, the Shawnee leader, moved to intercept Lewis's army, hoping to prevent the Virginians from joining forces. Estimates of the size of Cornstalk's force have varied, but scholars now believe Cornstalk was probably outnumbered at least 2 to 1, having between 300 and 500 warriors. Future Shawnee leader Blue Jacket probably took part in this battle.

Battle
Cornstalk's forces attacked Lewis's camp where the Kanawha River joins the Ohio River, hoping to trap him along a bluff. The battle lasted for hours and the fighting eventually became hand-to-hand. Cornstalk's voice was reportedly heard over the din of the battle, urging his warriors to "be strong." Lewis sent several companies along the Kanawha and up a nearby creek to attack the warriors from the rear, which reduced the intensity of the Shawnee offensive. Captain George Mathews was credited with a flanking maneuver that initiated Cornstalk's retreat. At nightfall, the Shawnees quietly withdrew back across the Ohio. The Virginians had held their ground, and thus are considered to have won.

Aftermath
The Virginians lost about 75 killed and 140 wounded.  The Shawnee's losses could not be determined, since they carried away their wounded and threw many of the dead into the river. The next morning, Colonel Christian, who had arrived shortly after the battle, marched his men over the battlefield. They found twenty-one dead warriors in the open, and twelve more were discovered hastily covered with brush and old logs. Among those killed was Pucksinwah, the father of Tecumseh.

Besides scalps, the Virginians reportedly captured 40 guns, many tomahawks and some plunder which was later sold at auction for 74£ 4s 6d.

The Battle of Point Pleasant forced Cornstalk to make peace in the Treaty of Camp Charlotte, ceding to Virginia the Shawnee claims to all lands south of the Ohio River (today's states of Kentucky and West Virginia). The Shawnee were also obligated in the Treaty of Camp Charlotte to return all white captives and stop attacking barges of immigrants traveling on the Ohio River.

Colonel John Field, an ancestor of United States Presidents George H. W. Bush and George W. Bush, was killed in the battle.

Legacy and historical controversies

In April 1775, before many of the Virginians had even returned home from Dunmore's War, the battles of Lexington and Concord took place in Massachusetts. The American Revolution had begun and Lord Dunmore led the British war effort in Virginia. By the end of that year, the same militiamen who had fought at Point Pleasant managed to drive Lord Dunmore and the British troops supporting him out of Virginia.

Before his expulsion, Dunmore had sought to gain indigenous allies, including the Shawnee the militia had defeated at Point Pleasant. Many Virginians suspected he had collaborated with the Shawnee from the beginning. They claimed Dunmore had intentionally isolated the militia under Andrew Lewis, meaning for the Shawnee to destroy them before the Royal Army troops arrived. Dunmore hoped to eliminate the militia in case a rebellion did break out. However, there is no evidence to support this theory and it is generally discounted.

On February 21, 1908, the United States Senate passed Bill Number 160 to erect a monument commemorating the Battle of Point Pleasant. It cites Point Pleasant as a "battle of the Revolution". The bill failed in the House of Representatives.

Nevertheless, the Battle of Point Pleasant is honored as the first engagement of the American Revolution during "Battle Days", an annual festival in modern Point Pleasant, now a city in West Virginia.

See also
 Tu-Endie-Wei State Park
 John Stuart (Virginia)

References

Bibliography
 Downes, Randolph C. Council Fires on the Upper Ohio: A Narrative of Indian Affairs in the Upper Ohio Valley until 1795. Pittsburgh: University of Pittsburgh Press, 1940.  (1989 reprint).
 Lewis, Virgil A., History of the Battle of Point Pleasant. Charleston, West Virginia: Tribune, 1909. Reprinted Maryland: Willow Bend, 2000. .
 Randall, E. O. The Dunmore War. Columbus, Ohio: Heer, 1902.
 Randall, Emilius Oviatt and Daniel Joseph Ryan. History of Ohio: the rise and progress of an American state, Volume 2. The Century History Company, 1912, public domain online edition
 Roosevelt, Theodore. The winning of the West, Volume 1 (1889) pp 227–33 online edition
 Smith, Thomas H., ed. Ohio in the American Revolution: A Conference to Commemorate the 200th Anniversary of the Ft. Gower Resolves. Columbus: Ohio Historical Society, 1976.
 Sugden, John. Blue Jacket: Warrior of the Shawnees. Lincoln and London: University of Nebraska Press, 2000. .
 Thwaites, Reuben Gold and Louise Phelps Kellogg, eds. Documentary History of Dunmore's War, 1774. Madison: Wisconsin Historical Society, 1905. Reprinted Baltimore: Clearfield, 2002. .

External links

 Point Pleasant Monument State Park web site
 "Manufactured History": Re-Fighting the Battle of Point Pleasant, 1997 article about the historical debate over whether the Battle of Point Pleasant should be considered a battle of the American Revolutionary War.
 "The Battle Song of the Great Kanawha", online exhibit from the Blue Ridge Institute about a ballad which recounted the battle.
 Point Pleasant Tourism Information

Shawnee history
Point Pleasant
Pre-statehood history of West Virginia
Mason County, West Virginia
Point Pleasant, West Virginia
1774 in Virginia
Point Pleasant